Theretra catherinae is a moth of the  family Sphingidae. It comes from Sulawesi in Indonesia.

References

Theretra
Moths described in 2010